Gadiel “Cho” Sánchez Rivera, is a Peruvian adventurer and jungle expert.  In August 2010, “Cho” ended the walk along the Amazon River that fellow adventurer Ed Stafford had started. In 2013 he achieved the world first kayak tour of Lake Titicaca.

Biography
Gadiel was born in 1978 in Pucallpa, Peru. He grew up in a rural settlement near the town of Satipo. He finished high school but his family could not afford to send him to university.  Instead, he went to work on his father’s farm. He wanted to expand his family’s agriculture business, but times were tough economically.

For that reason, he went to work for the Tala de Madera company of Satipo. Part of his job there included traveling to places where only indigenous people had been before. It was during his four years there that he realized how much he liked adventure.

Gadiel was grateful for the opportunity to come to know the jungle, but unfortunately, that just didn’t pay the bills. In 2004, he was offered a job with an industrial logging outfit that used skidders to chop down the forests. He took that job, but he quit after experiencing many things that were unpleasant not only for him, but for the natural environment which he had come to admire so much. 

Later, in 2008, Gadiel met the English explorer Ed Stafford, who initially hired him as a guide. Shortly thereafter, Mr. Stafford took him as his assistant for the end of the journey. Gadiel was known in the media by his nickname Cho. He walked with Stafford for exactly two years.

Expeditions
 2008 - 2010 - Walking the Amazon with Ed Stafford. Jungle guide and team member. A two-part documentary of the same name aired on Discovery Channel.
 2013 - TitiKayak expedition with Louis-Philippe Loncke. World first circumnavigation by kayak of lake Titicaca. Creation of the first geotagged photographic inventory of the lake: they took GPS coordinates of the location of the limit between the water and the ground and alongside photographs of the background. They also took underwater photos on the Northern Bolivian coast to locate the living habitat of the giant frog Telmatobius culeus. A talk was given by his expedition partner at TEDxFlanders.
 2015 - Solo Amazon. Gadiel is hired as consultant and guide by Polish adventurer Marcin Gienieczko to traverse the dangerous jungle areas controlled by the drug lords.
 2016 - He joined partly Laura Bingham on her biking trip from Ecuador to Argentina.

References

External links
 of Gadiel ‘Cho’ Sánchez Rivera

1978 births
Living people
Peruvian explorers
People from Pucallpa